The 2023 Seattle Sea Dragons season is the second season for the Seattle Sea Dragons as a professional American football franchise. They are charter members of the XFL, one of eight teams to compete in the league for the 2023 season. The Sea Dragons will play their home games at the Lumen Field and be led by head coach Jim Haslett.

The Sea Dragons had changed their franchise name from Seattle Dragons to Seattle Sea Dragons prior to the 2023 season.

Background 

The 2020 season was the inaugural season for the Seattle Dragons as a professional club. They were playing  as charter members of the rebooted XFL, one of eight teams to compete in the league for the season. The Dragons played their home games at CenturyLink Field and were led by head coach Jim Zorn.

Their inaugural season was cut short after 5 weeks due to the COVID-19 pandemic and the XFL suspended operations for the remainder of the season on March 20, 2020. The Dragons finished the season with a 1-4 record.

Schedule
All times Pacific

Game Summaries

Week 1: at DC Defenders

Week 2: vs. St. Louis BattleHawks

Week 3: at Vegas Vipers

Week 4: vs. San Antonio Brahmas

Week 5: vs. Houston Roughnecks

Week 6: at Orlando Guardians

Standings

Staff

Roster

References

Seattle
Seattle Sea Dragons
Seattle Sea Dragons